William de Courcy may refer to:

 William de Courcy (died circa 1114), Anglo-Norman baron
 William de Courcy (died before 1130), son of the above
 William de Courcy (died 1171), son of the second William